is a six-part novel written by Junpei Gomikawa. It was first published in Japan in 1958. The novel was an immediate bestseller and sold 2.4 million copies within its first three years after being published.  It became the basis for Masaki Kobayashi's film trilogy The Human Condition, released between 1959 and 1961. It had also been broadcast as a radio drama before the film release.

The novel is about the experience of the protagonist during World War II and is partly autobiographical. The novel is critical of Japan's role in the war. According to Naoko Shimazu, the novel is unique in that it portrays Japan as the aggressor during the war and how the Chinese, Korean and Japanese people themselves were victimized by those actions. Shimazu said that the novel was important for "purify[ing] the Japanese from their polluted past, by expressing their deeply held anger".

Right-wing critics in Japan criticized the novel's "sentimental humanism".

Currently, no English translation of the novel exists.

References

1958 Japanese novels
Novels set during World War II
Japanese novels adapted into films
Anti-fascist books